Italy competed at the 2022 Winter Paralympics in Beijing, China which took place between 4–13 March 2022.

Medalists

The following Italian competitors won medals at the games. In the discipline sections below, the medalists' names are bolded.

| width="56%" align="left" valign="top" |

| width="22%" align="left" valign="top" |

Participants 
32 in 4 sports. 4 athletes are women.

Alpine skiing 

Four male athletes and two female athletes, plus three guides, competed in alpine skiing for Italy, including the country's flagbearer in the opening ceremony, Giacomo Bertagnolli.

Men

Women

Cross-country skiing

Three Italian athletes competed in cross-country skiing.

Men

Relay

Para ice hockey

Italy qualified at the Paralympic Qualification Tournament held in Berlin, Germany.

Summary

The selected players are: 

 Alessandro Andreoni
 Gabriele Araudo
 Bruno Balossetti
 Cristoph De Paoli
 Alex Enederle
 Stephan Kafmann
 Julian Kasslatter
 Gabriele Lanza
 Nils Larch
 Andrea Macrì
 Roberto Radice
 Matteo Remotti Marnini
 Gianluigi Rosa
 Santino Stillitano
 Francesco Torella
 Gian Luca Cavaliere
 Stefan Kerschbaumer

Preliminary round

Quarterfinal

Fifth place game

Snowboarding

Three athletes competed for Italy in snowboarding.

Banked slalom

Cross

Qualification legend: FA – Qualify to medal round; FB – Qualify to consolation round

See also

Italy at the Paralympics
Italy at the 2022 Winter Olympics

References

Nations at the 2022 Winter Paralympics
2022
Winter Paralympics